Cerro Marahuaca, also spelled Marahuaka, is a tepui in Amazonas state, Venezuela. Cerro Marahuaca shares a common base with the much larger Cerro Duida and together they form the Duida–Marahuaca Massif. Both tepuis are located entirely within the bounds of Duida–Marahuaca National Park.

Cerro Marahuaca actually consists of two summit plateaus, the slightly larger northern one going by the Yekwana Amerindian name Fufha or Huha. The southern plateau is known by two local names; its northwestern edge is called Fuif or Fhuif, whereas its southeastern portion is called Atahua'shiho or Atawa Shisho. A massive ridge known as Cerro Petaca rises to at least  just west of these two plateaus. In 1973, the Italian expeditioner Walter Bonatti attempted to climb Cerro Marahuaca without success.  The first recorded ascent of Cerro Marahuaca dates back to 1984 on its Southwest face by Venezuelan climbers Luis Enrique (Kike) Arnal, Ramón Blanco, Manuel Guariguata and José Luis Pereyra. 

Flora and fauna
Several frog species are only known from the summit of Cerro Marahuaca, including Pristimantis marahuaka, Metaphryniscus sosai, and Myersiohyla inparquesi.

See also
 Distribution of Heliamphora
 List of Ultras of South America

References

Further reading

 Jaffe, K., J. Lattke & R. Perez-Hernández (January–June 1993). Ants on the tepuies of the Guiana Shield: a zoogeographic study. Ecotropicos 6(1): 21–28.

Tepuis of Venezuela
Mountains of Venezuela
Geography of Amazonas (Venezuelan state)
Guayana Highlands